Seimas Palace is the seat of the Seimas, the Lithuanian parliament. It is located in Lithuania's capital Vilnius.

History
Work began on the construction of the first wing of the palace, a purpose-built building for the Supreme Soviet of Lithuanian SSR, in 1976. The construction was supervised by architects Algimantas Nasvytis and Vytautas Nasvytis. In 1980, 9717.37 square meters of the palace were completed. Initially, the palace was named as "Soviet Palace". The other two wings housed Ministry of Finance of Lithuanian SSR and Trade Unions Council. Later the building was expanded due to growing needs. The final phase of the palace complex consists of three wings, with the main, or first wing, housing the Parliament Hall, where legislation is passed.

On 11 March 1990, Lithuania's independence was re-established in the old Parliament Hall, where the re-establishment declaration from the Soviet Union was adopted. On the same day, most of the emblems of the Lithuanian SSR, which were installed, were removed or covered by the coat of arms of Lithuania. In addition, in 1993–1997 the western wing of the first wing gave temporary shelter to the President of the Republic of Lithuania. Now, as in 1990–1992, it again houses the offices of the Speaker of Parliament and his Secretariat.

In 2006, work started on building a new Parliament Hall. Employees in the second wing were housed in temporary accommodation. On 10 September 2007, the new Parliament Hall was officially opened. It cost fifty million litas. The old Parliament Hall remained to be used for celebratory sessions of the Seimas (e. g. opening sessions of newly elected Seimas).

Gallery

References

See also

Great Seimas of Vilnius

Palaces in Vilnius
Legislative buildings in Europe